Royal Oath (foaled 27 April 2003) is an American-bred Thoroughbred racehorse. He won the Royal Hunt Cup at Royal Ascot in 2007.

References

2003 racehorse births
Racehorses bred in Kentucky
Racehorses trained in the United Kingdom
Racehorses trained in Canada
Thoroughbred family 9-c